A list of notable flat horse races which take place annually in Turkey, including all conditions races which currently hold Group status in the European Pattern. Turkish races were first included in the pattern in 2009.

Group 2

Group 3

Local Group 2

Local Group 3

References
 tjcis.com – Group races in Turkey 2012.

Horse racing in Turkey